Jay Leno (born 1950) is an American comedian and talk show host.

Leno may also refer to:

 Leno (surname)
 Leno, Lombardy, Italy, a town and comune
 Leno (stream), a stream in Italy
 Leno weave, a pattern in weaving
 Leño, a Spanish hard rock band from 1978 to 1983
 Leño (album) (1979)
 Leno, a stock character in theatre of ancient Rome who is a slave dealer or pimp

See also

 The Tonight Show with Jay Leno (1992–2009, 2010–2014)
 The Jay Leno Show (2009–2010)
 13212 Jayleno (1989 GN6, 1993 GQ, 1997 JL13), a main-belt asteroid